Georg Cruciger (also Creuziger, Kreuziger) (1575–1637) was a German Calvinist theologian and linguist.

Life
He was born in Merseburg, son of Caspar Cruciger the Younger.

Cruciger taught theology at Marburg. He was one of the representatives of Hesse-Kassel at the Synod of Dort 1618-9 

In 1624 he was dismissed from Marburg, with the other theologians  Johannes Crocius and Caspar Sturm, as a result of religious changes in Hesse.

Works
His Harmonia linguarum (1616), dedicated to Maurice, Landgrave of Hesse-Kassel, was a language harmony that listed over 2000 Hebrew roots and asserted derivatives in Latin, Greek and German (High German and some Dutch).

Notes

External links
WorldCat page

1575 births
1637 deaths
German Calvinist and Reformed theologians
Participants in the Synod of Dort
17th-century German Protestant theologians
German male non-fiction writers
17th-century German writers
17th-century German male writers
Cruciger family